Anker Jacobsen (17 July 1911 – 1975) was a Danish tennis player who was active during the 1930s and 1940s.

Career 
Jacobsen, a member of Copenhagen's KB, played at Wimbledon from 1932 to 1934 but lost his first match in each year. He was a member of the Danish Davis Cup team during the same period where he could win four out of eight matches.

Jacobsen won numerous titles at the Danish championships  until 1949:
outdoors:
singles: 1933, 1934, 1936–1941
doubles: 1947, 1949
mixed doubles: 1937–1940, 1941, 1942
indoors: 
singles: 1936, 1937, 1939, 1940, 1943
doubles: 1943, 1944 1947, 1949
mixed doubles: 1936, 1938–1940, 1942

References

External links 
 
 

1911 births
1975 deaths
Danish male tennis players
Date of death missing
20th-century Danish people